O Valadouro is a municipality in the Galician province of Lugo. O Valadouro belongs to the region of A Mariña Central. Its capital is the town of Ferreira. In 2011, it had 2,180 inhabitants according to the INE.

History and heritage
The site of Chao da Cruz is in the plain of Cabalar-A Veiga Blonde, at the foot of the Box O Cadramón. At this site about two thousand mounting tools made of chips of quartz, quartz and rock crystal were found along with prisms and an abundance of remains small in size and barely retouched.

Municipalities in the Province of Lugo